Saint-Martin-de-Fenouillet (before 2014: Saint-Martin; Languedocien: Sant Martin d'Endalens) is a commune in the Pyrénées-Orientales department in southern France.

Geography 
Saint-Martin-de-Fenouillet is located in the canton of La Vallée de l'Agly and in the arrondissement of Perpignan.

Population

See also
Communes of the Pyrénées-Orientales department

References

Saintmartindefenouillet
Fenouillèdes